This is a comparison of debuggers: computer programs that are used to test and debug other programs.

See also 
List of debuggers

References

Debugger
Debuggers